Giulio Berruti (born 27 September 1984) is an Italian actor and dentist, known for his roles in Monte Carlo (2011), Walking on Sunshine (2014), and Gabriel's Inferno (2020).

Life and career
Berruti was born in Rome, Italy, to ophthalmologist Giuseppe Berruti of Moncalvo and lawyer Francesca Romana Reggiani. He has an older brother, Gian Luca Berruti, lieutenant colonel of the Guardia di Finanza.

After obtaining a scientific high school diploma and a professional dental technician diploma, Berruti attended the University of Rome Tor Vergata School of Dentistry, and graduated in Dentistry and dental prosthesis in 2010. He subsequently undertook the specialization in Orthodontics and achieved it in 2015.

Berruti, who is 190 cm tall, had a fashion model career while in school, walking runways and participating in several fashion campaigns, for about three years since 1998. In 2003, he made his debut with a small role in the film The Lizzie McGuire Movie. He began rising to fame after appearing in Melissa P., La figlia di Elisa – Ritorno a Rivombrosa and Bon Appétit. In 2011, he starred in the film Monte Carlo and in 2014 he played the lead role in the musical comedy Walking on Sunshine.

In 2019, Berruti was cast by producer Tosca Musk of Passionflix, to play the main role of Gabriel Emerson in the novel adaptation of Gabriel's Inferno.

Filmography

Books
Giulio Berruti released an Italian novel called "Nutshell" in 2018.

References

External links

 
 Giulio Berruti Instagram

1984 births
Living people
Italian male film actors
Italian male television actors
21st-century Italian male actors
Male actors from Rome